Rathvilly is a barony in County Carlow, Republic of Ireland.

Etymology
Rathvilly barony takes its name from the village of Rathvilly, which derive from the Irish language Ráth Bhile, meaning "rath of the sacred tree".

Location

Rathvilly is found in north-east County Carlow. It contains the rivers Slaney and Derreen.

Rathvilly barony is bordered by the following baronies: to the west by Carlow; to the south by Forth; to the north by Upper Talbotstown; to the east by Ballinacor South; to the southeast by Shillelagh; and to the northwest by Kilkea and Moone.

History
In the 5th century, Crimthan, King of Leinster, lived at Rathvilly. The territory was that of the Uí Felmelda Tuaid, a Uí Cheinnselaig sept descended from Feidlimidh son of Enna Ceansalagh and brother of Crimthan. The MacKeoghs here were chief bards of the Kings of Leinster. An O'Neill family was cantered here.

List of settlements
Below is a list of settlements in Rathvilly barony:
Clonmore
Hacketstown
Rathvilly
Tullow

References

Baronies of County Carlow